The 1981 World Orienteering Championships, the 9th World Orienteering Championships, were held in Thun, Switzerland, 3–5 September 1981.

The championships had four events: individual contests for men and women, and relays for men and women.

Medalists

Results

Men's individual

Women's individual

References 

World Orienteering Championships
World Orienteering Championships
International sports competitions hosted by Switzerland
World Orienteering Championships
Orienteering in Switzerland
Thun